Ján Herkeľ (1786–1853) was a Slovak attorney and writer.

Herkel was born at Vavrečka, Kingdom of Hungary. He was the creator of Universalis Lingua Slavica, an early auxiliary language for Slavs.

Publications 
 1826 - Elementa universalis linguae Slavicae

Constructed language creators
1786 births
1853 deaths